Kaaval Poonaigal is a 1989 Indian Tamil-language film written and directed by Kalaipuli G. Sekaran. The film stars Raadhika, Nizhalgal Ravi, Bhanu Chander and Manjula. It was released on 19 May 1989.

Plot

Cast 
 Raadhika
 Nizhalgal Ravi
 Bhanu Chander
 Manjula
 Pandari Bai
 Senthil
 Somayajulu
 Balan K. Nair
 Prathapachandran
 Janardhan
 Baby Sujitha
 King Kong

Production 
Kaaval Poonaigal is based on true incidents. Due to its plot, the film became controversial and there were calls for its banning.

Soundtrack 
The music was composed by Sangeetha Rajan.

Release and reception 
Kaaval Poonaigal was released on 19 May 1989. P. S. S. of Kalki panned the film.

References

External links 
 

1980s Tamil-language films
1989 films
Films scored by S. P. Venkatesh
Indian films based on actual events